Mohamed Sifaoui (in Arabic محمد سيفاوي) (born 4 July 1967) is an Algerian-French journalist and writer who claimed that he managed to infiltrate al-Qaeda. He wrote a book about the experience, Mes "frères" assassins. Comment j'ai infiltré une cellule d'Al-Qaïda (meaning My assassin "brothers": How I infiltrated an al-Qaeda cell).
Many journalists criticize his ethics as his TV documentaries relate fictive situations and are polemical staging. Sifaoui has also been reprimanded by the Conseil supérieur de l'audiovisuel, the institution regulating the French media, for several racist comments related to the case of Estelle Mouzin ("un restaurateur asiatique mis en cause, à tort, par Mohammed Sifaoui, dans la disparition de la petite Estelle Mouzin").<ref>RMC: Mise en demeure du CSA, après dérapage raciste, Arrêt sur Images, 22 avril 2008.</ref>

Regardless of the controversy around his work, Mohammed Sifaoui has written a series of highly informative studies on Islamism, especially in France.

Bibliography
 La France malade de l'islamisme. Editions du Cherche Midi 2002.  
 Mes "frères" assassins. Comment j'ai infiltré une cellule d'Al-Qaïda. Editions du Cherche Midi 2003. 
 Sur les traces de Ben Laden. Editions du Cherche Midi 2004. 
 Lettre aux islamistes de France et de Navarre. Editions du Cherche Midi 2004. 
 L'Affaire des caricatures. Dessins et Manipulations. Edition Privé 2006. 
 Combattre le terrorisme islamiste. Editions Grasset 2007. 
 J'ai infiltré le milieu asiatique. Editions du Cherche Midi 2008.  
 Éric Zemmour, une supercherie française, Armand Colin 2010. 
 AQMI, Le groupe terroriste qui menace la France, Encre d'Orient, 2010. 
 Bouteflika, ses parrains et ses larbins, Encre d'Orient, 2011. 
 Histoire secrète de l'Algérie indépendante, Nouveau Monde, 2012. 
 Mon frère, ce terroriste'' (My brother the terrorist), 2012

See also 

 Chahdortt Djavann

References

External links 
Mohamed Sifaoui blog

1967 births
Living people
Former Muslims turned agnostics or atheists
Former Muslim critics of Islam
French male non-fiction writers
French people of Algerian descent
French critics of Islam